The Bank of Buffalo County, on Main St. in Gann Valley, South Dakota, is an Early Commercial-style building built in 1921.  It was listed on the National Register of Historic Places in 1999.

It is a  building with brick veneer walls, on a concrete foundation. It has a brick parapet and a shed roof.  It and several similar buildings were built with brick after a severe fire on Main St. in 1921.  It has also served as the Bank of Gann Valley and as the Gann Valley Post Office.

References

Bank buildings on the National Register of Historic Places in South Dakota
Early Commercial architecture in the United States
Buildings and structures completed in 1921
Buffalo County, South Dakota